The 89th 2012 Lithuanian Athletics Championships were held in S. Darius and S. Girėnas Stadium, Kaunas on 7–8 July 2012. For the first time Lithuanian Championships was open and athletes from Latvia, Russia and Azerbaijan also participated. 

10,000 m, race walking, decathlon/heptathlon and marathon championships was held in different tournaments.

Men

Track events

Field events

Women

Track events

Field events

Missing season leaders 
Rytis Sakalauskas (100 m, 200 m)
Martynas Jurgilas (100 m)
Natalija Piliušina (1500 m, 800 m)
Raivydas Stanys (high jump)
Vaida Žūsinaitė (3000 m steeplechase (participated in 5000 m))
Austra Skujytė (shot put, high jump (participated in long jump, 100 m hurdles, 200 m)
Darius Draudvila (pole vault)
Mantas Šilkauskas (110 m hurdles (participated in 100 m)
Sonata Tamošaitytė (100 m hurdles)
Dovilė Dzindzaletaitė (triple jump)

Foreign medalists  
 Līna Mūze (javelin throw) - 
 Mareks Ārents (pole vault) - 
 Rahib Mammadov (110 m hurdles) - 
 Tatyana Shushina (100 m) - 
 Andrej Polianovskij (400 m) - 
 Andrej Polianovskij, Andrej Pilin, Dmitrij Podlipailo, Maksim Tkačenko (4x400 m) -

References 
Results 1
Results 2

External links 
 Lithuanian athletics

Lithuanian Athletics Championships
Athletics
Lithuanian Athletics Championships